Hugi is a surname. Notable people with the surname include:

Dor Hugi (born 1995), Israeli footballer
Franz Joseph Hugi (1791–1855), Swiss geologist and teacher
Hans Hügi (1926–2000), Swiss footballer
Ofer Hugi (born 1964), Israeli politician
Urs Hugi (born 1952), Swiss modern pentathlete